The Second Federal Electoral District of Nayarit (II Distrito Electoral Federal de Nayarit) is one of the 300 Electoral Districts into which Mexico is divided for the purpose of elections to the federal Chamber of Deputies and one of three such districts in the state of Nayarit.

It elects one deputy to the lower house of Congress for each three-year legislative period, by means of the first past the post system.

District territory
Nayarit's Second District is located in the centre of the state and covers the municipality of Tepic.

The district's head town (cabecera distrital), where results from individual polling stations are gathered together and collated, is the state capital, the city of Tepic.

Previous districting schemes

1996–2005 district
Between 1996 and 2005, Nayarit's Second  District covered the municipality of Tepic,
plus the municipalities of El Nayar and La Yesca.

Deputies returned to Congress from this district 

L Legislature
 1976–1979:  María Hilaria Domínguez Arvizu
LI Legislature
 1979–1982:  Emilio M. González (PRI)
LII Legislature
 1982–1985:  Ignacio González Barragán
LIII Legislature
 1985–1988:  Leobardo Ramos Martínez
LIV Legislature
 1988–1991: Ignacio González Barragán
LV Legislature
 1991–1994:  Víctor Joaquín Canovas Moreno (PRI)
LVI Legislature
 1994–1997:  José Santos Ramos Damián (PRI)
LVII Legislature
 1997–2000:  Salvador Sánchez Vázquez (PRI)
LVIII Legislature
 2000–2002:  Ney González Sánchez (PRI)
2002–2003:  Luis Eduardo Jiménez Agraz (PRI)
LIX Legislature
 2003–2006:  Gerardo Montenegro Ibarra (PRI)
LX Legislature
 2006–2009:  María Eugenia Jiménez Valenzuela (PRD)
 LXI Legislature
 2009–2012:  Martha Elena García Gómez (PRD)
 LXII Legislature
 2012–2014:  Roy Gómez Olguín (PRI)
 2014–2015:  Ángel Alain Aldrete Lamas (PRI)

References and notes 

Federal electoral districts of Mexico
Nayarit